IL Therapeutics Inc. was previously owned by Western Life Sciences Venture Fund LP
("Western Life Sciences") and in 2006 its shares were purchased by Pacgen Biopharmaceuticals Corporation ("Pacgen").

History
Saskatchewan Research Council operates a bioprocessing laboratory which facilitated biomedical research. IL Therapeutics was developed from research first begun at the Western College of Veterinary Medicine.

Pharmaceuticals
Currently IL Therapeutics is working on a drug candidate, IL-8(3-73)K11R/G31P ("PAC-G31P") for relief of Acute Respiratory Distress Syndrome (ARDS). The Saskatchewan Research council, SRC also assisted with the funding of this project through the Agriculture Development Fund - SRC Industry Venture Fund. With the successful progression of G31P, the University of Saskatchewan Industry Liaison Office (ILO) decided to commercialize a commercialize this new drug treatment. This research has been sponsored by a $3 million boost from the Western Life Sciences Venture Fund (WLS)

See also
Biotechnology
List of biotechnology companies
Innovation Place Research Park
University of Saskatchewan

References

External links
ILC Therapeutics Ltd
University of Saskatchewan Research - Discovery @ U of S: May 24, 2006
AgBiotech Bulletin
Europe and GMOs: the dance continues In this issue:
U of S News Releases: November 2004 Archives
Untitles
Western College of Veterinary Medicine

Biotechnology companies established in 2005
Research institutes in Canada
University of Saskatchewan
Companies based in Saskatoon
Pharmaceutical companies of Canada
Biotechnology companies of Canada
Biotechnology companies disestablished in 2006
2006 mergers and acquisitions